Toivo Ilmari Hannikainen (19 October 1892, in Jyväskylä – 25 July 1955, in Kuhmoinen) was a Finnish composer and virtuoso pianist.

Hannikainen was the son of Pekka Juhani Hannikainen and the brother of Väinö Hannikainen, both of whom were composers and of Tauno Hannikainen who was a conductor. After studying at the University of Helsinki (1911–14), he became a pupil of Franz Schreker at the Musikakademie in Vienna, and continued his studies with Alexander Siloti in Saint Petersburg (1915–17) and with Alfred Cortot in Paris (1919). Returning to Finland, he taught piano at the Helsinki Conservatory and later gained a Professorship at the Sibelius Academy.

Hannikainen steered Finnish classical music from late Romanticism towards Impressionism. In addition to his piano miniatures, which best illustrated this development, he composed one opera, one piano concerto, one piano quartet, lieder, and film scores (notably, Sången om den eldröda blomman, Sweden, 1934).

Hannikainen drowned during a sailing trip in Kuhmoinen in 1955. Some musical colleagues, like Aarre Merikanto, considered his death a suicide. He is buried in the Hietaniemi Cemetery in Helsinki.

In the 1970s, the Ilmari Hannikainen Pianokilpailu (Ilmari Hannikainen Piano Competition) was created dedicated to Hannikainen. In 2020, the competition renewed its format style.

Notes

References
Biography from Kimmo Korhonen's Inventing Finnish Music: Contemporary Composers from Medieval to Modern, Finnish Music Information Centre (2003)

External links

Songs by Ilmari Hannikainen on The Art Song Project

1892 births
1955 deaths
People from Jyväskylä
People from Vaasa Province (Grand Duchy of Finland)
Finnish male composers
Romantic composers
20th-century classical composers
Finnish film score composers
Male film score composers
Finnish classical pianists
Deaths by drowning
20th-century classical pianists
Burials at Hietaniemi Cemetery
Male classical pianists
20th-century male musicians
19th-century male musicians
20th-century Finnish composers